Damias choiseuli is a moth of the family Erebidae. It is found on the Solomon Islands.

References

Damias
Moths described in 1904